was a Japanese professional baseball player. He was a pitcher for the Chunichi Dragons of Nippon Professional Baseball.

Kinoshita began his professional career in 2015 with the Tokushima Indigo Socks of the Shikoku Island League Plus. In June 2016, Kinoshita played for a team of All-Stars from that league which visited the United States and played against teams from the Can-Am League and the Cuban National Team.

On 20 October 2016, Kinoshita was selected as the 1st round development draft pick by the Chunichi Dragons at the 2016 NPB Draft and on 9 November signed a provisional contract with a ¥2,000,000 sign-on bonus and a ¥3,000,000 yearly salary.

On 23 March 2018, Kinoshita was upgraded to a fully rostered contract and presented with the number 98.

Kinoshita collapsed due to cardiopulmonary arrest on 6 July 2021, during rehabilitation training on his right shoulder at Nagoya Stadium and was rushed to the hospital, where he was put on a ventilator. He died without regaining consciousness on 3 August 2021. There was some media speculation that his death was connected to his having received his first dose of a COVID-19 vaccine eight days prior to his collapse, but no such causal link has been established.

References

External links

1993 births
2021 deaths
Baseball people from Osaka
Japanese baseball players
Nippon Professional Baseball pitchers
Chunichi Dragons players